Berezova is a rural locality (a village) in Yurlinskoye Rural Settlement, Yurlinsky District, Perm Krai, Russia. The population was 16 as of 2010. There are 3 streets.

Geography 
Berezova is located 59 km northwest of Yurla (the district's administrative centre) by road. Lipova is the nearest rural locality.

References 

Rural localities in Yurlinsky District